HMS Palomares was a British anti-aircraft ship of the Second World War.

Originally MV Palomares, built by William Doxford & Sons, Sunderland yard in 1937, it operated as a merchant fruit carrier ship (a 13.5 knot banana boat) for service on the MacAndrews Line in January 1938 with their Spanish service.

Service
She was purchased by the British Admiralty in 1940, as these fruit ships were considered to be fast and manoeuvrable. In 1941 the Admiralty converted her to  an Anti-Aircraft Artillery ship and subsequently to a  fighter direction ship ("seagoing Anti Aircraft Auxiliaries"). Most likely the conversion took place at Fairfields yard in Govan on the Clyde with her sister ship .

In June 1942, she sailed as an escort in Convoy PQ 17, where 25 out 36 ships were lost to the enemy, while working around Murmansk and Archangel.

In November 1942, HMS Palomares took part in the Operation Torch landings in Algiers as an Anti Aircraft ship. The ship left Gibraltar on the 3rd and arrived on the 8th. However the next day Palomares was hit by a bomb suffering a large number of casualties, engulfed in flames her steering gear was put out of action. Deceased seamen were transferred to the corvette  for burial at sea and her steering gear was repaired by the 10th.

In September 1943, during the Salerno landings of Italy on the 9th, Palomares was a  fighter direction ship, directing fighter planes with her radar system.

In January 1944, Palomares again served as a Fighter Direction ship during the Anzio landings. Arriving at the beachhead on the 22nd, she struck a mine and was towed back to Naples by the tugs Edenshaw and Evea.

In September 1945, Palomares was to have participated in the Malaya landings but couldn't as a fire had damaged her engine room.

Armaments and displacement
Upon being converted as an Anti Aircraft ship HMS Palomares was equipped with eight 4-inch AA guns in four turrets and eight 2-pounder (40mm) AA guns in two quadruple mounts. 
In December 1942, to take the role as a fighter-direction ship, Palomares was fitted with radar for directing fighter aircraft.

HMS Palomares had a weight of 1,896 tons and could move at 13.5 knots.

Returned
Surviving the war, HMS Palomares was returned to the MacAndrews Line in 1946, where she continued service with the company until 1959. She was then sold, being renamed Mary Sven and in 1961 sold again becoming Sarabande. On  5 October 1961 following a fire she drifted aground and was wrecked.

References

World War II naval ships of the United Kingdom
1937 ships
Auxiliary anti-aircraft ships of the Royal Navy
Ships built on the River Wear
Banana boats